Marvin Lee Eastman (born June 8, 1971) is a retired American professional mixed martial artist and kickboxer. A professional MMA competitor from 2000 until 2013, he competed in K-1, the UFC, World Fighting Alliance, Maximum Fighting Championship, Shooto, and King of the Cage, where he was Super Heavyweight Champion. A talented athlete, he also played football in the CFL for the Calgary Stampeders.

Background

Marvin Eastman was born and raised in Merced, California, where he grew up wrestling and playing American football. Eastman began wrestling with his older brother's junior varsity team at an early age, going on to dominate for the Merced High School wrestling team, going undefeated (42-0) in his senior year and winning the California State Wrestling Championship at the 86.6 kilogram/191 pound weight-class. Eastman then continued playing football in college for the Merced College team, where he earned All-American honors, in his two years at the school. He was then offered a full scholarship to play football for the University of Washington but ultimately decided to sign with University of Nevada, Las Vegas, where he excelled in two seasons as a running back and fullback for the Running Rebels, and then played for the Calgary Stampeders of the Canadian Football League. Eastman then decided that he wanted to challenge himself in the rising world of mixed martial arts, and began training in Muay Thai.

Career
Eastman made his MMA debut with King of the Cage in June 2000. He won three straight, including a win over future UFC champion Quinton "Rampage" Jackson before losing to Vernon White.

Following his loss to White, Eastman fought future UFC Middleweight Champion Rich Franklin at the World Fighting Alliance's first event, Franklin won by armbar in the first round. Eastman rebounded in the next two WFA events with wins over Alex Stiebling and Tommy Sauer. On August 17, 2002, he caused an upset by defeating four-time world champion Duke Roufus in his first foray into K-1 kickboxing on the K-1 World Grand Prix 2002 in Las Vegas undercard. Roufus was dominant for the first two rounds although Eastman did score a flash knockdown when he caught a low kick and countered with a right cross in the second. Then, in the third and final round, Eastman completed the comeback, landing two knees to Roufus' body and putting him away for good.

Eastman made his Ultimate Fighting Championship debut at UFC 43 against another future UFC Light heavyweight titlist Vitor Belfort, Belfort delivered a knee to Eastman's forehead that dropped him resulting in quite possibly the largest cut in recorded mixed martial art history, thus losing via technical knockout due to strikes in just 1 minute 7 seconds of the very first round. He then returned to King of the Cage to defeat Vernon White via unanimous decision in a rematch. He also made a return to K-1 and competed in the K-1 World Grand Prix 2004 in Las Vegas I tournament on April 30, 2004. Against Michael McDonald in the quarter-finals, he dropped the Canadian in round one but was then floored three times himself in round two to lose by TKO. In his third and final outing in the promotion, Eastman fought Ray Sefo in a non-tournament bout at the K-1 World Grand Prix 2004 in Las Vegas II on August 7, 2004. Both men traded heavy leather early on and Eastman took a time out after being poked in the eye by Sefo's toes during a high kick attempt. Immediately following the restart, Sefo swarmed on Eastman and forced the referee to call off the fight. The crowd in attendance booed the stoppage and Eastman himself protested, apparently seeing Sefo's quick attack as sucker punching. Both fighters traded verbal insults and Eastman then attacked Sefo only to be punched to the canvas. As both sets of cornermen got caught up in the ruckus, Nevada Athletic Commission officials were needed to break up the brawl.

Late in 2004, Eastman was given another shot in the UFC against Travis Lutter at UFC 50. After a fairly uneventful first round, Lutter caught Eastman with an overhand right, knocking Eastman out cold 43 seconds into the second round. Shortly after his second UFC defeat, Eastman lost a split decision to Jason Lambert at KOTC's Mortal Sin event. He then went 6–1 in smaller shows, with victories over fighters such as Jason MacDonald, Alan Belcher, and Jason Guida in a rematch.

In 2006, Eastman became the Elite Fighting Championships (EFC) Light heavyweight Champion with a majority decision win over UFC and PRIDE veteran Travis Wiuff. On July 22, 2006, the WFA reemerged with King of Streets featuring Quinton Jackson, Matt Lindland, Bas Rutten, and Lyoto Machida, among others. Eastman fought to a draw against Jorge Oliviera.

Eastman made his third appearance in the UFC at UFC 67, losing a hard-fought rematch with Quinton Jackson by knockout in the second round. Eastman won a unanimous decision over Rob Kimmons at IFO: Eastman vs. Kimmons, claiming the IFO's middleweight title. He returned to the Ultimate Fighting Championship at UFC 81 on February 2, 2008, defeating "Dangerous" Terry Martin in a dominant unanimous decision.

At The Ultimate Fighter 7 Finale, Eastman was defeated by Drew McFedries in the first round via knockout. In October 2008, Eastman lost to PRIDE and Spirit MC veteran Denis Kang by knockout 48 seconds into the opening round. Eastman was set to fight PRIDE veteran Ricardo Arona in late December but pulled out of the fight due to a knee injury suffered during training. Eastman defeated Aaron Lofton at MFC 21, winning by technical knockout. Eastman lost to Ricardo Arona by unanimous decision in the long-awaited fight at Bitetti Combat MMA 4.

A month after his loss to Arona, Eastman fought up and coming Canadian prospect Ryan Jimmo at MFC 22 on October 2. Twenty six seconds into the round, Eastman dropped and almost finished Jimmo with a straight right hand and hammer fist afterward but Jimmo weathered the storm and was able to out strike Eastman for the remainder of the round. In the second round Jimmo kept Eastman at bay with punches and kicks, midway through the second round Jimmo landed an elbow from the clinch that opened a significant gash under Eastman's left eye; the doctor checked on Eastman and let him continue. With only thirty seconds remaining in the second round Eastman was wobbled by a short uppercut from Jimmo but was able to clinch with the Canadian and survive the round. In the final round Eastman was able to land more clean strikes than he did in the first two rounds, Eastman also managed to take Jimmo down twice; seconds before the final bell Jimmo sent Eastman crashing to the mat with a stiff jab. Jimmo defeated Eastman by split decision. As a result, Eastman had lost five out of his last eight bouts.

Eastman faced former professional boxer Dwayne Lewis at MFC 23 on December 4, 2009. Lewis was the aggressor in the fight continually attacking Eastman with punch combinations to the head and body. With only two seconds left in the round, Lewis connected with an uppercut directly to the chin that sent "The Beastman" pummeling to the mat and followed up with three clean shots to the chin of an unconscious Eastman before the referee could pull him off the unconscious Eastman thus giving Lewis the KO win at 4:58 of the first round. Next he fought Steve Bossé, the only significant action in the fight took place in the 1st round where Bossé knocked Eastman down with a left hook. Eastman lost the mediocre bout by unanimous decision. Eastman had lost 8 out of his last 14 fights.

He then faced Api Hemara, winning by TKO in the third round and snapping his four fight losing streak but soon lost his next fight he was KO'd by Glover Teixeira. Eastman faced Dmitry Zabolotny at Lou Neglia's Ring of Combat XL in Atlantic City, New Jersey on April 27, 2012, he won the fight via unanimous decision.

Making his return to Muay Thai, Eastman was initially set to fight Ricardo van den Bos for the vacant WPMF World Super Heavyweight (+95.454 kg/210.4 lb) Championship at Muaythai Superfight in Pattaya, Thailand on May 13, 2013. The event was pushed back to June 14, 2013, however, and he lost by TKO midway through the second round.

On September 28, 2013, Eastman faced Sean O'Connell at SHOWDOWN FIGHTS: XII Buchholz vs. Collard II. Eastman lost via unanimous decision.

Personal life
Aside from his fighting career, Eastman also works as a retired corrections officer in Las Vegas.

Championships and awards

Amateur wrestling
California Interscholastic Federation
California State Wrestling -86.6 kg/191 lb Championship

Mixed martial arts
Elite Fighting
Elite Fighting Light heavyweight (-92.9 kg/205 lb) Championship
International Fighting Organization
IFO Middleweight (-83.9 kg/185 lb) Championship
King of the Cage
KOTC Super Heavyweight (+120.2 kg/265 lb) Championship
World Extreme Fighting
WEF Light heavyweight (-92.9 kg/205 lb) Championship

Submission grappling
Grapplers Quest
Grapplers Quest Heavyweight (-94.8 kg/209 lb) Championship

Kickboxing record

|-  style="background:#fbb;"
| 2013-05-13 || Loss ||align=left| Ricardo van den Bos || Muaythai Superfight || Pattaya, Thailand || TKO (punches) || 2 || 1:25 || 17-9
|-
! style=background:white colspan=9 |
|-  style="background:#fbb;"
| 2011-11-18 || Loss ||align=left| Randy Blake || Xtreme Fight Night 5 || Tulsa, Oklahoma, USA || KO (left high kick) || 1 || || 17-8
|-
! style=background:white colspan=9 |
|-  style="background:#fbb;"
| 2004-08-07 || Loss ||align=left| Ray Sefo || K-1 World Grand Prix 2004 in Las Vegas II || Las Vegas, Nevada, USA || TKO (punches) || 1 || 1:32 || 17-7
|-  style="background:#fbb;"
| 2004-04-30 || Loss ||align=left| Michael McDonald || K-1 World Grand Prix 2004 in Las Vegas I, Quarter Finals || Las Vegas, Nevada, USA || TKO (punches) || 2 || 1:25 || 17-6
|-  style="background:#cfc;"
| 2002-08-17 || Win ||align=left| Duke Roufus || K-1 World Grand Prix 2002 in Las Vegas || Las Vegas, Nevada, USA || KO (knees to the body) || 3 || || 
|-
| colspan=9 | Legend:

Mixed martial arts record

|-
| Loss
| align=center| 18–15–1
| Sean O'Connell
| Decision (unanimous)
| SHOWDOWN FIGHTS: XII Buchholz vs. Collard II
| 
| align=center| 3
| align=center| 5:00
| Orem, Utah, United States
| 
|-
| Win
| align=center| 18–14–1
| Dmitry Zabolotny
| Decision (unanimous)
| Ring of Combat 40
| 
| align=center| 3
| align=center| 5:00
| Atlantic City, New Jersey, United States
| 
|-
| Loss
| align=center| 17–14–1
| Glover Teixeira
| KO (punch)
| Shooto Brasil 25: Fight for BOPE
| 
| align=center| 1
| align=center| 4:00
| Rio de Janeiro, Brazil
| 
|-
| Win
| align=center| 17–13–1
| Api Hemara
| TKO (knees and punches)
| Xtreme MMA 2: ANZ vs. USA
| 
| align=center| 3
| align=center| 4:29
| Sydney, New South Wales, Australia
| 
|-
| Loss
| align=center| 16–13–1
| Steve Bossé
| Decision (unanimous)
| Mixed Fighting League 2: Battleground
| 
| align=center| 3
| align=center| 5:00
| Montreal, Quebec, Canada
| 
|-
| Loss
| align=center| 16–12–1
| Dwayne Lewis
| KO (punch)
| MFC 23
| 
| align=center| 1
| align=center| 4:58
| Enoch, Alberta, Canada
| 
|-
| Loss
| align=center| 16–11–1
| Ryan Jimmo
| Decision (split)
| MFC 22
| 
| align=center| 3
| align=center| 5:00
| Enoch, Alberta, Canada
| 
|-
| Loss
| align=center| 16–10–1
| Ricardo Arona
| Decision (unanimous)
| Bitetti Combat 4
| 
| align=center| 3
| align=center| 5:00
| Rio de Janeiro, Brazil
| 
|-
| Win
| align=center| 16–9–1
| Aaron Lofton
| TKO (elbows)
| MFC 21
| 
| align=center| 2
| align=center| 0:49
| Enoch, Alberta, Canada
| 
|-
| Loss
| align=center| 15–9–1
| Denis Kang
| TKO (punches)
| Raw Combat: Redemption
| 
| align=center| 1
| align=center| 0:48
| Calgary, Alberta, Canada
| 
|-
| Loss
| align=center| 15–8–1
| Drew McFedries
| TKO (punches)
| The Ultimate Fighter: Team Rampage vs Team Forrest Finale
| 
| align=center| 1
| align=center| 1:08
| Las Vegas, Nevada, United States
| 
|-
| Win
| align=center| 15–7–1
| Terry Martin
| Decision (unanimous)
| UFC 81
| 
| align=center| 3
| align=center| 5:00
| Las Vegas, Nevada, United States
| 
|-
| Win
| align=center| 14–7–1
| Rob Kimmons
| Decision (unanimous)
| IFO: Eastman vs. Kimmons
| 
| align=center| 5
| align=center| 5:00
| Las Vegas, Nevada, United States
| 
|-
| Loss
| align=center| 13–7–1
| Quinton Jackson
| KO (punches)
| UFC 67
| 
| align=center| 2
| align=center| 3:49
| Las Vegas, Nevada, United States
| 
|-
| Draw
| align=center| 13–6–1
| Jorge Oliveira
| Draw
| WFA: King of the Streets
| 
| align=center| 3
| align=center| 5:00
| Los Angeles, California, United States
| 
|-
| Win
| align=center| 13–6
| Jason Guida
| Decision (unanimous)
| WEF: Orleans Arena
| 
| align=center| 5
| align=center| 5:00
| Las Vegas, Nevada, United States
| 
|-
| Loss
| align=center| 12–6
| Jason Guida
| Submission (guillotine choke)
| World Extreme Fighting 17
| 
| align=center| 3
| align=center| 2:07
| Las Vegas, Nevada, United States
| 
|-
| Win
| align=center| 12–5
| Travis Wiuff
| Decision (majority)
| Elite Fighting 1: Supremacy
| 
| align=center| 4
| align=center| 5:00
| Vancouver, British Columbia, Canada
| 
|-
| Win
| align=center| 11–5
| Yan Pellerin
| Submission (arm-triangle choke)
| TKO Major League MMA 22: Lionheart
| 
| align=center| 2
| align=center| 2:55
| Montreal, Quebec, Canada
| 
|-
| Win
| align=center| 10–5
| Alan Belcher
| Decision (unanimous)
| World Extreme Fighting 16
| 
| align=center| 5
| align=center| 5:00
| Enid, Oklahoma, United States
| 
|-
| Win
| align=center| 9–5
| Antony Rea
| TKO (elbow)
| World Extreme Fighting: Houston
| 
| align=center| 4
| align=center| 2:26
| Houston, Texas, United States
| 
|-
| Win
| align=center| 8–5
| Jason MacDonald
| Decision (unanimous)
| World Extreme Fighting: Sin City
| 
| align=center| 3
| align=center| 5:00
| Las Vegas, Nevada, United States
| 
|-
| Loss
| align=center| 7–5
| Jason Lambert
| Decision (split)
| KOTC: Mortal Sins
| 
| align=center| 3
| align=center| 5:00
| Primm, Nevada, United States
| 
|-
| Win
| align=center| 7–4
| Vincent Lawler
| TKO (submission to punches)
| Desert Heat 4
| 
| align=center| 1
| align=center| 1:56
| Phoenix, Arizona, United States
| 
|-
| Loss
| align=center| 6–4
| Travis Lutter
| KO (punch)
| UFC 50
| 
| align=center| 2
| align=center| 0:43
| Atlantic City, New Jersey, United States
| 
|-
| Win
| align=center| 6–3
| Vernon White
| Decision (unanimous)
| KOTC 32: Bringing Heat
| 
| align=center| 3
| align=center| 5:00
| Miami, Florida, United States
| 
|-
| Loss
| align=center| 5–3
| Vitor Belfort
| TKO (knees and punches)
| UFC 43
| 
| align=center| 1
| align=center| 1:07
| Las Vegas, Nevada, United States
| 
|-
| Win
| align=center| 5–2
| Alex Stiebling
| KO (punch)
| WFA 3: Level 3
| 
| align=center| 1
| align=center| 1:07
| Las Vegas, Nevada, United States
| 
|-
| Win
| align=center| 4–2
| Tommy Sauer
| TKO (elbows)
| WFA 2: Level 2
| 
| align=center| 2
| align=center| 1:35
| Las Vegas, Nevada, United States
| 
|-
| Loss
| align=center| 3–2
| Rich Franklin
| Submission (armbar)
| World Fighting Alliance 1
| 
| align=center| 1
| align=center| 1:02
| Las Vegas, Nevada, United States
| 
|-
| Loss
| align=center| 3–1
| Vernon White
| Decision (split)
| KOTC 8: Bombs Away
| 
| align=center| 3
| align=center| 5:00
| Williams, California, United States
| 
|-
| Win
| align=center| 3–0
| Floyd Sword
| Decision (split)
| KOTC 7: Wet and Wild
| 
| align=center| 3
| align=center| 5:00
| San Jacinto, California, United States
| 
|-
| Win
| align=center| 2–0
| Ioka Tianuu
| TKO (submission to punches)
| KOTC 5: Cage Wars
| 
| align=center| 1
| align=center| 3:32
| San Jacinto, California, United States
| 
|-
| Win
| align=center| 1–0
| Quinton Jackson
| Decision (unanimous)
| KOTC 4: Gladiators
| 
| align=center| 2
| align=center| 5:00
| San Jacinto, California, United States
|

References

External links
Official UFC profile
Official K-1 profile
K-1Sport profile

1971 births
Living people
African-American mixed martial artists
African-American players of American football
African-American players of Canadian football
African-American sport wrestlers
American male kickboxers
American male mixed martial artists
American Muay Thai practitioners
American prison officers
American male sport wrestlers
Heavyweight kickboxers
Heavyweight mixed martial artists
Ultimate Fighting Championship male fighters
Kickboxers from California
Light heavyweight mixed martial artists
Merced College alumni
Middleweight mixed martial artists
Mixed martial artists utilizing Muay Thai
Mixed martial artists utilizing collegiate wrestling
Mixed martial artists from California
People from Merced, California
UNLV Rebels football players
21st-century African-American sportspeople
20th-century African-American sportspeople